The 2015 NACRA Women's Sevens Championships was an Olympic qualification tournament for Rugby sevens at the 2016 Summer Olympics held at WakeMed Soccer Park in Cary, North Carolina, USA on 13–14 June 2015. It was the 11th championship in a series that began in 2005.
The tournament used a round-robin format, with the top team qualifying directly to the Olympics, and the second and third place teams qualifying for the Olympic Qualification Tournament.

Pools

Pool Stage 

The ranking of each team in each group were determined as follows:

 higher win percentage in all group matches;
 points obtained in all group matches;
 most wins (including Overtime Wins) in all group matches;
 highest points difference in all group matches;
 lowest points against in all group matches;

Pool A

Pool B

Placement Stage

Quarterfinals

Fifth–Eighth Place

Final standings

See also
 2015 NACRA Sevens (men)

References

2015
2015 rugby sevens competitions
2015 in North American rugby union
2015 in women's rugby union
International women's rugby union competitions hosted by the United States
2015 in American rugby union
rugby union
Sports in Raleigh-Durham
2015 in sports in North Carolina